The Association of Tennis Professionals (ATP) Challenger Series is the secondary professional tennis circuit organized by the ATP. The 2008 ATP Challenger Series calendar comprised 176 tournaments, with prize money ranging from $25,000 up to $150,000.

Schedule
The table below shows the 2008 ATP Challenger Series schedule.

January

February

March

April

May

June

July

August

September

October

November

+H: Any Challenger or Futures providing hospitality shall receive the points of the next highest prize
money level in that category$. /€25,000+H Challengers receive points shown at$/€50,000. Monies
shown for Challengers and Futures are on-site prize amounts.

Statistical Information
List of players and ATP challenger titles won, last name alphabetically:
 Thomaz Bellucci – Santiago, Florianópolis, Rabat, Tunis (4)
 Teymuraz Gabashvili – Telde, Karlsruhe, Milan, Mons (4)
 Go Soeda – Kyoto, Busan, New Delhi, Toyota City (4)
 Kristof Vliegen – Wrocław, Geneva, Düsseldorf, Grenoble (4)
 Marcos Daniel – Bogotá, Cali, Bogotá (3)
 Nicolas Devilder – Braunschweig, Constanţa, Poznań (3)
 Diego Junqueira – Sanremo, Rimini, Como (3)
 Yen-Hsun Lu – Waikoloa, New Delhi, Tashkent (3)
 Iván Navarro – Meknes, Córdoba, Medjugorje (3)
 Bobby Reynolds – Tallahassee, Baton Rouge, Knoxville (3)
 Eduardo Schwank – Cremona, Rome, Bordeaux (3)
 Martín Vassallo Argüello – Asunción, Buenos Aires, Lima (3)
 Pablo Andújar – Vigo, San Sebastian (2)
 Andreas Beck – Sarajevo, Dresden (2)
 Ilija Bozoljac – Ljubljana, Banja Luka (2)
 Paul Capdeville – Binghamton, Aracaju (2)
 Brian Dabul – San Luis Potosí, Campos do Jordão (2)
 Amer Delic – Dallas, Carson (2)
 Michail Elgin – Saransk, Samarkand (2)
 Fabio Fognini – Turin, Genova (2)
 Frederico Gil – Sassuolo, Istanbul (2)
 Daniel Gimeno-Traver – Aarhus, Brașov (2)
  Andrey Golubev – Heilbronn, Astana (2)
 Simon Greul – Freudenstadt, Alphen (2)
 Jan Hernych – Prague, Bratislava (2)
 Denis Istomin – Bukhara, Karshi (2)
 Roko Karanušić – Belgrade, Kolding (2)
 Robert Kendrick – Louisville, Nashville (2)
 Kevin Kim – Aptos, Tulsa (2)
 Daniel Köllerer – Fürth, Cali (2)
 Giovanni Lapentti – Manta, Quito (2)
 Hyung-Taik Lee – Seoul, Yokohama (2)
 Alberto Martín – Trnava, Tarragona (2)
 Nicolás Massú – Rijeka, Florianópolis (2)
 Iván Miranda – Salinas, Tunica (2)
 Mathieu Montcourt – Reggio Emilia, Tampere (2)
 Gilles Müller – Humacao, Izmir (2)
 Björn Rehnquist – Guangzhou, Manchester (2)
 Christophe Rochus – St. Brieuc, Zagreb (2)
 Vincent Spadea – Waco, Calabasas (2)
 Tomas Tenconi – Todi, Napoli (2)
 Filippo Volandri – San Marino, Cordenons (2)
 Thiago Alves – São Paulo (1)
 Kevin Anderson – Champaign (1)
 Thierry Ascione – Cherbourg (1)
 Younes El Aynaoui – Chiasso (1)
 Alex Bogdanovic – Granby (1)
 Stéphane Bohli – Lanzarote (1)
 Daniel Brands – Timișoara (1)
 Agustín Calleri – Prostějov (1)
 Jérémy Chardy – Graz (1)
 Flavio Cipolla – Nouméa (1)
 Victor Crivoi – Manerbio (1)
 Frank Dancevic – Surbiton (1)
 Sebastián Decoud – Almaty (1)
 Somdev Devvarman – Lexington (1)
 Lukáš Dlouhý – Bronx (1)
 Benedikt Dorsch – Penza (1)
 Bruno Echagaray – Leon (1)
 Marc Gicquel – Besançon (1)
 Máximo González – San Benedetto (1)
 Santiago González – Belo Horizonte (1)
 Marcel Granollers – Tanger (1)
 Denis Gremelmayr – Eckental (1)
 Robin Haase – Sunrise (1)
 Luis Horna – Lugano (1)
 Jesse Huta Galung – Scheveningen (1)
 Marsel İlhan – Ramat Hasharon (1)
 John Isner – Lubbock (1)
 Dieter Kindlmann – New Delhi (1)
 Evgeny Korolev – Aachen (1)
 Łukasz Kubot – Oberstaufen (1)
  Mikhail Kukushkin – Barletta (1)
 Igor Kunitsyn – Donetsk (1)
 Michael Lammer – Puebla (1)
 Jesse Levine – Bradenton (1)
 Ivan Ljubičić – East London (1)
 Paolo Lorenzi – Alessandria (1)
 Peter Luczak – Montevideo (1)
 Nicolas Mahut – Orléans (1)
 Xavier Malisse – Moncton (1)
 Adrian Mannarino – Jersey (1)
 Leonardo Mayer – Medellín (1)
 Ivo Minář – Busan (1)
 Gaël Monfils – Marrakech (1)
 Albert Montañés – Monza (1)
 Conor Niland – New Delhi (1)
 Kei Nishikori – Bermuda (1)
 Dawid Olejniczak – Mexico City (1)
 Josselin Ouanna – Rennes (1)
 Olivier Patience – Cherkassy (1)
 Éric Prodon – Miami (1)
 Mariano Puerta – Bogotá (1)
 Rajeev Ram – Winnetka (1)
 Rubén Ramírez Hidalgo – La Serena (1)
 Laurent Recouderc – Bytom (1)
 Pere Riba – Seville (1)
 Sergio Roitman – Guayaquil (1)
 Lukáš Rosol – Košice (1)
 Fabrice Santoro – Dnipropetrovsk (1)
 Dudi Sela – Vancouver (1)
 Andreas Seppi – Bergamo (1)
 Florent Serra – Szczecin (1)
 Robert Smeets – Dublin (1)
 Pavel Šnobel – Fergana (1)
 Louk Sorensen – Wolfsburg (1)
 Sergiy Stakhovsky – Segovia (1)
 Potito Starace – Napoli (1)
 Ryan Sweeting – Rimouski (1)
 Dmitry Tursunov – Helsinki (1)
 Adrian Ungur – Sofia (1)
 Jiří Vaněk – Ostrava (1)
 Santiago Ventura – Bucharest (1)
 Martin Verkerk – Athens (1)
 Michael Yani – Yuba City (1)
 Donald Young – Sacramento (1)
 Horacio Zeballos – Recanati (1)
 Grega Žemlja – Cancún (1)

The following players won their first ATP challenger title:
 Thomaz Bellucci – Santiago
 Stéphane Bohli – Lanzarote
 Daniel Brands – Timișoara
 Victor Crivoi – Manerbio
 Somdev Devvarman – Lexington
 Bruno Echagaray – Leon
 Fabio Fognini – Turin
  Andrey Golubev – Heilbronn
 Santiago González – Belo Horizonte
 Marsel İlhan – Ramat Hasharon
 Adrian Mannarino – Jersey
 Conor Niland – New Delhi
 Kei Nishikori – Bermuda
 Dawid Olejniczak – Mexico City
 Josselin Ouanna – Rennes
 Rajeev Ram – Winnetka
 Laurent Recouderc – Bytom
 Pere Riba – Seville
 Lukáš Rosol – Košice
 Andreas Seppi – Bergamo
 Louk Sorensen – Wolfsburg
 Sergiy Stakhovsky – Segovia
 Ryan Sweeting – Rimouski
 Adrian Ungur – Sofia
 Michael Yani – Yuba City
 Horacio Zeballos – Recanati
 Grega Žemlja – Cancún

ATP challenger titles won by nation:
 Argentina 18 (Almaty, Asunción, Bogotá, Bordeaux, Buenos Aires, Campos do Jordão, Como, Cremona, Guayaquil, Medellín, Peru, Prostějov, Recanati, Rimini, Rome, San Benedetto, San Luis Potosí, Sanremo)
 France 17 (Besançon, Braunschweig, Bytom, Cherbourg, Cherkassy, Constanţa, Dnipropetrovsk, Graz, Jersey, Marrakech, Miami, Orléans, Poznań, Reggio Emilia, Rennes, Szczecin, Tampere)
 17 (Aptos, Baton Rouge, Bradenton, Calabasas, Carson, Dallas, Knoxville, Louisville, Lubbock, Nashville, Rimouski, Sacramento, Tallahassee, Tulsa, Waco, Winnetka, Yuba City)
 Spain 14 (Aarhus, Brașov, Bucharest, Córdoba, La Serena, Medjugorje, Meknes, Monza, San Sebastian, Seville, Tanger, Tarragona, Trnava, Vigo)
 Russia 11 (Aachen, Barletta, Donetsk, Heilbronn, Helsinki, Karlsruhe, Milan, Mons, Samarkand, Saransk, Telde)
 Italy 10 (Alessandria, Bergamo, Cordenons, Genova, Napoli, Napoli, Nouméa, San Marino, Todi, Turin)
 Brazil 8 (Bogotá, Bogotá, Cali, Florianópolis, Rabat, Santiago, São Paulo, Tunis)
 Germany 8 (Alphen, Dresden, Eckental, Freudenstadt, New Delhi, Penza, Sarajevo, Timișoara)
 Belgium 7 (Düsseldorf, Geneva, Grenoble, Moncton, St. Brieuc, Wrocław, Zagreb)
 Czech Republic 6 (Bratislava, Bronx, Busan, Košice, Ostrava, Prague)
 Japan 5 (Bermuda, Busan, Kyoto, New Delhi, Toyota City)
 Chile 4 (Aracaju, Binghamton, Florianópolis, Rijeka)
 Chinese Taipei 3 (New Delhi, Tashkent, Waikoloa)
 Croatia 3 (Belgrade, East London, Kolding)
 Netherlands 3 (Athens Scheveningen, Sunrise)
 Peru 3 (Lugano, Salinas, Tunica)
 Australia 2 (Dublin, Montevideo)
 Austria 2 (Cali, Fürth)
 Ecuador 2 (Manta, Quito)
 Ireland 2 (New Delhi, Wolfsburg)
 Luxembourg 2 (Humacao, Izmir)
 Mexico 2 (Belo Horizonte, Leon)
 Poland 2 (Mexico City, Oberstaufen)
 Portugal 2 (Istanbul, Sassuolo)
 Romania 2 (Manerbio, Sofia)
 Serbia 2 (Banja Luka, Ljubljana)
 South Korea 2 (Seoul, Yokohama)
 Sweden 2 (Guangzhou, Manchester)
 Switzerland 2 (Lanzarote, Puebla)
 Uzbekistan 2 (Bukhara, Karshi)
 Canada 1 (Surbiton)
 Great Britain 1 (Granby)
 India 1 (Lexington)
 Israel 1 (Vancouver)
 Kazakhstan 1 (Astana)
 Morocco 1 (Chiasso)
 Slovenia 1 (Cancún)
 South Africa 1 (Champaign)
 Turkey 1 (Ramat Hasharon)
 Ukraine 1 (Segovia)

See also
 2008 in tennis
 2008 WTA Tour
 ATP International Series Gold
 ATP International Series
 2008 ATP Tour

References

External links
 Association of Tennis Professionals (ATP) official website

 
ATP Challenger Tour
ATP Challenger Series